Qasīdat al-Burda ("Ode of the Mantle"), or al-Burda for short, is a thirteenth-century ode of praise for the Islamic prophet Muhammad composed by the eminent Sufi mystic Imam al-Busiri of Egypt. The poem whose actual title is al-Kawākib ad-durriyya fī Madḥ Khayr al-Bariyya ("The Celestial Lights in Praise of the Best of Creation"), is famous mainly in the Sunni Muslim world. It is entirely in praise of Muhammad, who is said to have been praised ceaselessly by the afflicted poet, to the point that Muhammad appeared in a dream and wrapped him in a mantle or cloak; in the morning the poet discovers that God has cured him.

Bānat Suʿād, a poem composed by Ka'b bin Zuhayr was originally called as Al-Burdah. He recited this poem in front of Muhammad after embracing Islam. Muhammad was so moved that he removed his mantle and wrapped it over him. The original Burdah is not as famous as the one composed by Imam al-Busiri even though Muhammad had physically wrapped his mantle over Ka'b not in a dream like in the case of Imam al-Busiri.

Composition 

The Burda is divided into 10 chapters and 160 verses all rhyming with each other. Interspersing the verses is the refrain, "My Patron, confer blessings and peace continuously and eternally on Your Beloved, the Best of All Creation" (Arabic: مولاي صل وسلم دائما أبدا على حبيبك خير الخلق كلهم). Each verse ends with the Arabic letter mīm, a style called mīmiyya. The 10 chapters of the Burda comprise:

On Lyrical love yearnly
On Warnings about the Caprices of the Self
On the Praise of the Prophet
On His Birth
On His Miracles
On the Exalted Stature and Miraculous Merits of the Qur'an
On the Ascension of the Prophet
On the Struggle of Allah's Messenger
On Seeking Intercession through the Prophet
On Intimate Discourse and the Petition of One's State.

Popularity 
Sufi Muslims have traditionally venerated the poem. It is memorized and recited in congregations, and its verses decorate the walls of public buildings and mosques. This poem decorated Al-Masjid al-Nabawi (the mosque of Muhammad) in Medina for centuries but was erased but for two lines. Over 90 commentaries have been written on this poem and it has been translated into Hausa, Persian, Urdu, Turkish, Berber, Punjabi, English, French, German, Sindhi, Saraiki, Norwegian, Chinese (called Tianfangshijing), and other languages. It is known and recited by a large number of Sunni Muslims, ordinarily and on special occasions, such as Mawlid, making it one of the most recited poems in the world.

Translations
The poem has seen several different translations, into a variety of languages. Arguably the most important translation of recent times is that by Timothy Winter into English. The book was also translated into four different languages: Persian, Urdu, Punjabi and English by Dr. Muhammad Hamid.

Audio
The full rendition of this famous poem has been produced by The Adel Brothers. They have sung the full poem in over 20 different styles.

Legacy
The Burda was accepted within Sufi Islam and was the subject of numerous commentaries by mainstream Sufi scholars such as Ibn Hajar al-Haytami, Nazifi and Qastallani It was also studied by the Shafi'i hadith master Ibn Hajar al-Asqalani (d. 852 A.H.) both by reading the text out loud to his teacher and by receiving it in writing from a transmitter who heard it directly from Busiri himself.

The founder of Wahhabism, Muhammad ibn Abd al-Wahhab, considered the poem to be shirk (idolatory).

See also
Al-Busiri
Durood
Islamic poetry
Mesut Kurtis

References

Bibliography

External links
Qasida Burda – Qasida Burda (the nasheed)
Al-Burda on the BBC
Iqra.net: The Prophet's Mantle
Translation of al-Burda and other resources
Recitation of Qasida Al Burda
MA Thesis: Understanding the Poem of the Burdah in Sufi Commentaries
The Mantle Adorned a translation by Timothy Winter
'The Mantle of Praise' Full rendition of the Qasida Burda by The Adel Brothers

Further reading
 Muhammad in History, Thought, and Culture: An Encyclopedia of the Prophet of God (2 vols.), Edited by C. Fitzpatrick and A. Walker, Santa Barbara, ABC-CLIO, 2014. 
 ''La Burda du désert, Touria Ikbal, Faiza Tidjani & Muhammad Vâlsan, Edited by Science sacrée, 2015. 
Al Borda (Le manteau): Poème consacré à l’éloge du Prophète de l’Islam (sur lui la prière et le salut) Broché , TEMASAMANI Chebagouda Abdelhamid– 16 novembre 2020 

Works by Al-Busiri
Islamic poetry
Sufi literature
Panegyrics
Medieval Arabic poems
Sunni literature
Muhammad